Thomas Foster served as the sixth Mayor of Los Angeles. He was a physician and responsible for the first schoolhouse to be built at Spring and 2nd Streets. He was not related to mayor Stephen C. Foster. He was elected in May 1855 over William G. Dryden, 192 votes to 179.

References

California Democrats
Mayors of Los Angeles
Politicians from Los Angeles
Year of death missing
Year of birth missing